Mornar is a South Slavic occupational surname literally meaning "mariner" or "sailor."

Mornar may also refer to:
FK Mornar
KK Mornar Bar
RK Mornar Bar
VK Mornar
Ragbi Klub Mornar Bar

See also